S. tigris may refer to:
 Scoturius tigris, a jumping spider species
 Sepia tigris, a cuttlefish species
 Spariolenus tigris, a huntsman spider species in the genus Spariolenus

See also
 Tigris (disambiguation)